The Meijer LPGA Classic is a women's professional golf tournament in  Michigan on the LPGA Tour. Founded in 2014, it is played at Blythefield Country Club in Belmont, a suburb northeast of Grand Rapids.

Mirim Lee won the inaugural tournament in a playoff with Inbee Park for her first LPGA Tour win.

Nelly Korda won her second LPGA tournament in 2021, finishing with a new Meijer record of 263, winning by two strokes over Leona Maguire. A round record, which tied two others in past years, of 62 on Saturday gave her a three-stroke lead (196 to 199) from her 62 to Maguire's 70, after trailing Maguire by five strokes (134 to 129) after the second round. Korda was ranked #4 in the world, won her fifth LPGA title. Korda eagled the par-5 14th hole, to go with six birdies and three bogeys. In the final round, Korda led by just one stroke going to the 18th hole, which she birdied for her two-stroke win. Her 263 for the 72 holes also set a new tournament record as was her 25 strokes below par.

Tournament names through the years:
2014–2015: Meijer LPGA Classic presented by Kraft
2016–2018: Meijer LPGA Classic for Simply Give

Course

Winners

* Par for rounds 3 and 4 in 2017 lowered to 69 due to course flooding;5th hole was converted from a par 5 to a par 3.

Tournament records

References

External links

Coverage on the LPGA Tour's official site
Blythefield Country Club – official site

LPGA Tour events
Golf in Michigan
Sports in Grand Rapids, Michigan
Recurring sporting events established in 2014
2014 establishments in Michigan
Women's sports in Michigan